Pupki may refer to the following places:
Pupki, Podlaskie Voivodeship (north-east Poland)
Pupki, Olsztyn County in Warmian-Masurian Voivodeship (north Poland)
Pupki, Ostróda County in Warmian-Masurian Voivodeship (north Poland)